Balesin Airport  is a private airport serving Balesin Island, an island under the jurisdiction of Polillo, Quezon but currently occupied and operated by Alphaland Corporation as a membership resort.

It is also known as the E.L. Tordesillas Airport, after the island's original owner Edgardo Tordesillas, when it still had an unpaved runway. The runway is now paved with concrete, and has a length of about 1,500 meters. The airport is currently served by charter flights for resort guests.

The runway also serves as a rainwater catchment. Its constructed at a certain angle to redirect freshwater to nearby reservoirs and ponds.

Airlines and destinations

Accidents and incidents
 On October 19, 2013, a SkyJet aircraft, on a flight chartered by Alphaland Corporation to bring tourists to Balesin Island, overshot the runway by 200 meters. No injuries were reported but the aircraft was damaged beyond repair.

See also
 List of airports in the Philippines

References

External links
 Balesin Island Club
 Accident history of Balesin Airport at Aviation Safety Network

Airports in the Philippines
Buildings and structures in Quezon